Jean Charles Claude Gallon (25 June 1878 - 23 June 1959) was a French composer, choir conductor, and music educator. His compositional output consists of six antiphons for strings and organ, one mass, one ballet, and several art songs.

Biography 
Born in Paris, Gallon was the elder brother of composer Noël Gallon. He had a long association with the Paris Conservatoire, first as a student, then as the director of concerts (1906-1914), and then as a faculty member from 1919 to 1949. A professor of harmony, he taught such notable musicians as Elsa Barraine, Paul Bonneau, Henri Challan, Georges Dandelot, Jean-Yves Daniel-Lesur, Jeanne Demessieux, Pierre Dervaux, Maurice Duruflé, Henri Dutilleux, Ulvi Cemal Erkin, Jean Hubeau, Paule Maurice, Olivier Messiaen, Jean Rivier, Pierre Sancan, and Paul Tortelier. He was the choir master at the Paris Opera from 1909 to 1914.

He died in Paris in 1959.

1878 births
1959 deaths
20th-century classical composers
Academic staff of the Conservatoire de Paris
Conservatoire de Paris alumni
French classical composers
French male classical composers
French male conductors (music)
20th-century French composers
20th-century French conductors (music)
20th-century French male musicians